Meshir 11 - Coptic Calendar - Meshir 13

The twelfth day of the Coptic month of Meshir, the sixth month of the Coptic year. In common years, this day corresponds to February 6, of the Julian Calendar, and February 19, of the Gregorian Calendar. This day falls in the Coptic Season of Shemu, the season of the Harvest.

Commemorations

Heavenly Orders 

 Monthly commemoration of Archangel Michael

Saints 

 The departure of Saint Gelasius the Ascetic

References 

Days of the Coptic calendar